is an event established by Yomiuri Shimbun in 2015. Awards are given in four categories: Manga, Anime, Light novel and Entertainment novel. In the first year, the award was given to Puella Magi Madoka Magica as 'Grand Prix'.

The word Sugoi is a Japanese word meaning amazing, wonderful and great.

Winners

2015
Manga award: Attack on Titan
Anime award: Puella Magi Madoka Magica (Grand Prix)
Light novel award: My Youth Romantic Comedy Is Wrong, As I Expected
Entertainment novel award: Library War

2016
Manga award: One Punch Man
Anime award: Your Lie in April
Light novel award: Is It Wrong to Try to Pick Up Girls in a Dungeon?
Entertainment novel award: The Empire of Corpses

2017
Manga award: My Hero Academia
Anime award: Re:Zero − Starting Life in Another World
Light novel award: Re:Zero − Starting Life in Another World
Entertainment novel award: Your Name

See also

 List of animation awards
 List of manga awards

References

External links
 Official website

Animation awards
Anime awards
Awards established in 2015
2015 establishments in Japan
Arts organizations based in Japan
Manga awards